The 1948 Washington Senators won 56 games, lost 97, and finished in seventh place in the American League. They were managed by Joe Kuhel and played home games at Griffith Stadium. It was the first Senators season to be broadcast on television with Bob Wolff on the booth for gameday broadcasts on WTTG-TV.

Regular season

Season standings

Record vs. opponents

Roster

Player stats

Batting

Starters by position
Note: Pos = Position; G = Games played; AB = At bats; H = Hits; Avg. = Batting average; HR = Home runs; RBI = Runs batted in

Other batters
Note: G = Games played; AB = At bats; H = Hits; Avg. = Batting average; HR = Home runs; RBI = Runs batted in

Pitching

Starting pitchers
Note: G = Games pitched; IP = Innings pitched; W = Wins; L = Losses; ERA = Earned run average; SO = Strikeouts

Other pitchers
Note: G = Games pitched; IP = Innings pitched; W = Wins; L = Losses; ERA = Earned run average; SO = Strikeouts

Relief pitchers
Note: G = Games pitched; W = Wins; L = Losses; SV = Saves; ERA = Earned run average; SO = Strikeouts

Farm system

LEAGUE CHAMPIONS: Sherman–Denison, Havana

Notes

References
1948 Washington Senators at Baseball-Reference
1948 Washington Senators team page at www.baseball-almanac.com

Minnesota Twins seasons
Washington Senators season
Washington